Dragon Cone is a monogenetic cinder cone located in Wells Gray Provincial Park in east-central British Columbia. Geologists have recovered some peat buried by the lava and radiocarbon dating produced an age of 7560 years plus or minus 100 years. Flows from nearby Flourmill Cone, Kostal Cone and Spanish Lake Cones rest on glaciated bedrock without an intervening paleosol, suggesting an early Holocene age.

Visits to Dragon Cone are very rare due to difficult access. Falls Creek is impassable for boats. The cone is best viewed from the air, but float plane landings on nearby Ray Lake are not permitted.

See also
List of volcanoes in Canada
Volcanism of Canada
Volcanism of Western Canada

References

Wells Gray-Clearwater
Cinder cones of British Columbia
Holocene volcanoes
Monogenetic volcanoes
One-thousanders of British Columbia